The following is a list of notable films produced in Iceland by Icelanders. Star marked films are films in coproduction with Iceland. Although Arne Mattsson is Swedish, his film is included because it is based on a book by the Icelandic Nobel Prize-winning author Halldór Laxness.

1900–1979

1980s

1990s

2000s

2010s

2020s

Films strongly related to Iceland
Partial list films strongly related to Iceland while not produced in Iceland by Icelanders:
 Iceland (1942)
 The Texas Chain Saw Massacre (1974)
 The Secret Life of Walter Mitty (2013)
 Reykjavik (2014)
 Land Ho (2014)

Films (partly) shot in Iceland

 Saga Borgarættarinnar (1919) - first film shot in Iceland
 A View to a Kill (1985) - opening scene
 Judge Dredd (1995)
 Independence Day (1996)
 The Fifth Element (1997)
 Lara Croft: Tomb Raider (2001)
 Die Another Day (2002)
 The League of Extraordinary Gentlemen (2003)
 Batman Begins (2005) - scenes on ice shot in Iceland
 Flags of Our Fathers (2006) - war scenes on black beach
 Journey to the Center of the Earth (2008)
 Birdsong (2008)
 Thor: The Dark World (2013)
 Oblivion (2013)
 The Secret Life of Walter Mitty (2013) - also includes Icelandic actors
 Interstellar (2014)
 Rogue One (2016)

References